Robert Frederick Shedinger (born 23 November 1959) is an American Professor of Religion at Luther College (Iowa) and he was the Chair of the Department of Religion from 2008-2011.

Biography

Education 
Shedinger received his B.S. in Civil Engineering Technology at Temple University in 1982 (Graduated Magna Cum Laude). In 1994 he received his M.Div. at Eastern Baptist Theological Seminary. In 1998 Shedinger received his M.A. in Religious Studies at Temple University. From 2000, he holds his Ph.D from Temple University in Religious Studies, with his dissertation: Tatian and the Jewish Scriptures (accepted with distinction) He also was Graduate Teaching Assistant while earning his Ph.D. in Religious Studies at Temple University.

Awards 
Shedinger won the American Bible Society Award for Excellence in Biblical Studies

Views 
His research interests revolve around the question “What is Religion?” which includes the Syriac versional tradition of the New Testament, theoretical approaches to the study of religion, Christian-Muslim relations in the contemporary world.

Shedinger initiated a hypothesis in which he proposes "that the theory of Tatianic dependence upon de OTP [Old Testament Peshitta] is tenuous at best", against Jan Joosten's reaction: "Tatianic use of the OT Peshitta has been stablished more strongly that before as a viable hypothesis." William Lawrence Petersen "enderses neither position", and according to Ulrich B. Schmid this debate has not generated a true consensus on the question of Tatianic use of the Old Testament Peshitta.

Shedinger has also been able to cite examples where the Shem Tob's Hebrew Gospel of Matthew  coincides with many readings in the Greek Gospel of Matthew and those found only on 𝔓45, thus supporting Howard's thesis that the Shem Tob's text was based on an ancient Hebrew text. Additionally he finds 67 other variants among ancient Greek texts "neither the Byzantine manuscript tradition nor the Vulgate and Latin tradition".

Works

Thesis

Books

Articles

References 

1959 births
Living people
New Testament scholars
Temple University alumni
Luther College (Iowa)